Jamall Leantwean Emmers (born July 24, 1989) is an American mixed martial artist who currently competes in the featherweight division of the Ultimate Fighting Championship.

Background

Emmers transitioned to MMA from a high school and college wrestling background, but it was actually MMA that first inspired him. A fan of watching MMA fights with his dad and brother, Jamall's dad would rent PRIDE FC tapes from Blockbuster for them to watch. Emmers said he joined his high school wrestling team specifically to lay a foundation for a career in MMA.

Mixed martial arts career

Early career and DWCS
Emmers racked up 13–3 record in American regional circuit, most notably holding a decision wins against future UFC fighters Alexander Hernandez and Cory Sandhagen at LFA 5. Emmers was invited to the Dana White's Contender Series. He faced Julian Erosa at Dana White's Contender Series 11 on June 26, 2018. Despite knocking Erosa down in the first round, Emmers lost the fight via second-round knockout.

Ultimate Fighting Championship
After the Contender Series loss Emmers won four straight fights and was signed to the UFC to fight Movsar Evloev at UFC 248 on March 7, 2020, on short notice, replacing Douglas Silva de Andrade. However, Evloev was injured in an motorcycle accident and was replaced by Giga Chikadze. Emmers lost the fight via split decision.

Emmers was expected to make his sophomore appearance in the organization against Timur Valiev at UFC Fight Night: Brunson vs. Shahbazyan on August 1, 2020. However, Valiev withdrew from the bout and was replaced by Vince Cachero. Emmers won the fight via unanimous decision.

Emmers was next expected to face Chas Skelly at UFC Fight Night: Blaydes vs. Lewis on February 20, 2021. However, the bout was cancelled moments before it was expected to begin as Emmers suffered back spasms backstage rendering him unable to compete.

Emmers faced Pat Sabatini on August 28, 2021, at UFC on ESPN: Barboza vs. Chikadze. Emmers knocked down Sabatini early in the fight, but was caught by a heel hook and forced to submit in round one.

Emmers was scheduled to face Daniel Pineda on May 14, 2022, at UFC on ESPN 36. However, the bout was scrapped in late April due to unknown reasons.

Emmers faced Khusein Askhabov on February 18, 2023, at UFC Fight Night 219. He won the fight via unanimous decision.

Championships and accomplishments
Hero FC
Hero FC Featherweight Championship (one time; former)
Two successful title defenses
SMASH Global
SMASH Global Featherweight Championship (one time; former)

Mixed martial arts record

|-
|Win
|align=center|19–6
|Khusein Askhabov
|Decision (unanimous)
|UFC Fight Night: Andrade vs. Blanchfield
|
|align=center|3
|align=center|5:00
|Las Vegas, Nevada, United States
|
|-
|Loss
|align=center|18–6
|Pat Sabatini
|Submission (heel hook)
|UFC on ESPN: Barboza vs. Chikadze 
|
|align=center|1
|align=center|1:53
|Las Vegas, Nevada, United States
|
|-
|Win
|align=center|18–5
|Vince Cachero
|Decision (unanimous)
|UFC Fight Night: Brunson vs. Shahbazyan 
|
|align=center|3
|align=center|5:00
|Las Vegas, Nevada, United States
|
|-
|Loss
|align=center|17–5
|Giga Chikadze
|Decision (split)
|UFC 248 
|
|align=center|3
|align=center|5:00
|Las Vegas, Nevada, United States
|
|-
|Win
|align=center|17–4
|Rafael Barbosa
|Technical Submission (arm-triangle choke)
|LFA 81
|
|align=center|3
|align=center|2:39
|Costa Mesa, California, United States
|
|-
|Win
|align=center|16–4
|Jay Cucciniello
|TKO (punches)
|Final Fight Championship 38
|
|align=center|1
|align=center|4:53
|Las Vegas, Nevada, United States
|
|-
|Win
|align=center|15–4
|Caio Machado
|TKO (retirement)
|M-1 Global: Road to M-1 USA 2
|
|align=center|1
|align=center|5:00
|Fort Yuma Indian Reservation, California, United States
|
|-
|Win
|align=center|14–4
|Fard Muhammad
|TKO (punches)
|SMASH Global 8
|
|align=center|2
|align=center|1:55
|Los Angeles, California, United States
|
|-
|Loss
|align=center|13–4
|Julian Erosa
|KO (head kick and punches)
|Dana White's Contender Series 11
|
| style="text-align:center;"|2
| style="text-align:center;"|1:10
|Las Vegas, Nevada, United States
|
|-
|Win
|align=center|13–3
|Guilherme Faria de Souza
|TKO (punches)
|LFA 36
|
|align=center|3
|align=center|1:18
|Cabazon, California, United States
|
|-
|Win
|align=center|12–3
|Chris Avila
|Decision (unanimous)
|GKO 11
|
|align=center|3
|align=center|5:00
|Jackson, California, United States
|
|-
|Win
|align=center|11–3
|Cory Sandhagen
|Decision (unanimous)
|LFA 5
|
|align=center|3
|align=center|5:00
|Broomfield, Colorado, United States
|
|-
|Win
|align=center|10–3
|Rivaldo Junior
|Decision (unanimous)
|RFA 41
|
|align=center|3
|align=center|5:00
|San Antonio, Texas, United States
|
|-
|Loss
|align=center|9–3
|Thiago Moisés
|TKO (punches)
|RFA 38: Moisés vs. Emmers
|
|align=center|5
|align=center|2:52
|Costa Mesa, California, United States
|
|-
|Win
|align=center|9–2
|Ray Cervera
|Decision (unanimous)
|Tachi Palace Fights 25
|
|align=center|3
|align=center|5:00
|Lemoore, California, United States
|
|-
|Win
|align=center|8–2
|Merwyn Rivera
|Submission (rear-naked choke)
|Tachi Palace Fights 23
|
|align=center|1
|align=center|0:34
|Lemoore, California, United States
|
|-
|Loss
|align=center|7–2
|Rey Trujillo
|Submission (triangle choke)
|Hero FC 4
|
|align=center|2
|align=center|1:48
|Brownsville, Texas, United States
|
|-
|Win
|align=center|7–1
|Michael Rodriguez
|TKO (punches)
|Hero FC 3
|
|align=center|1
|align=center|0:27
|Brownsville, Texas, United States
|
|-
|Win
|align=center|6–1
|Chris Pecero
|TKO (punches)
|Hero FC 2
|
|align=center|3
|align=center|3:39
|Brownsville, Texas, United States
|
|-
|Win
|align=center|5–1
|Brett Ewing
|Decision (unanimous)
|Hero FC 1
|
|align=center|3
|align=center|5:00
|Harlingen, Texas, United States
|
|-
|Win
|align=center|4–1
|Brett Ewing
|TKO (punches)
|Hero FC: Texas Pride
|
|align=center|2
|align=center|0:54
|Beaumont, Texas, United States
|
|-
|Win
|align=center|3–1
|Alexander Hernandez
|Decision (split)
|Hero FC: Pride of the Valley 2
|
|align=center|3
|align=center|5:00
|Pharr, Texas, United States
|
|-
|Win
|align=center|2–1
|Ernest de la Cruz
|Decision (unanimous)
|Legacy FC 17
|
|align=center|3
|align=center|5:00
|San Antonio, Texas, United States
|
|-
|Loss
|align=center|1–1
|Matt Mazurek
|Decision (split)
|ABG Promotions
|
|align=center|3
|align=center|5:00
|San Antonio, Texas, United States
|
|-
|Win
|align=center|1–0
|James Gonzalez
|Submission (rear-naked choke)
|Big Dawg Promotions: In the Cage I Trust
|
|align=center|2
|align=center|0:54
|Texas City, Texas, United States
|

See also 
 List of current UFC fighters
 List of male mixed martial artists

References

External links 
 
 

Living people
1989 births
Featherweight mixed martial artists
Mixed martial artists utilizing collegiate wrestling
American male mixed martial artists
African-American mixed martial artists
Ultimate Fighting Championship male fighters
American male sport wrestlers
Amateur wrestlers
21st-century African-American sportspeople
20th-century African-American people